VA-831 was an Attack Squadron of the U.S. Navy Reserve. Details of its early years are sketchy, as few records exist for reserve squadrons prior to 1970, the year during which they began submitting history reports.

In July 1968, the squadron was the first activated East Coast reserve unit to be assigned to an operational air wing. The squadron was deactivated and returned to reserve status on 18 October 1968.

Home port assignments
The squadron was assigned to these home ports, effective on the dates shown:
 NAS New York – 27 January 1968
 NAS Cecil Field – 30 May 1968

Aircraft assignment
The squadron first received the following aircraft on the dates shown:
 A-4B Skyhawk – January 1968

See also
List of squadrons in the Dictionary of American Naval Aviation Squadrons
Attack aircraft
List of inactive United States Navy aircraft squadrons
History of the United States Navy

References

Attack squadrons of the United States Navy
Wikipedia articles incorporating text from the Dictionary of American Naval Aviation Squadrons